On  July 28, 2010, a C-17 Globemaster III transport plane of the U.S. Air Force (USAF) crashed at Elmendorf Air Force Base in Alaska, while practicing for a flight display at the upcoming Arctic Thunder Air Show. All four crew members on board were killed. It was the first and, to date, only fatal accident of a C-17 aircraft.

The subsequent investigation blamed pilot error for the low-altitude stall that led to the aircraft impacting the ground.

Accident

On  July 28, 2010, the crew was conducting a local training flight in preparation for the upcoming Arctic Thunder Air Show, to be held at the Elmendorf AFB from 31 July to 1 August. The C-17 is commonly featured in U.S. air shows, highlighting its short takeoff and landing capability. The plane had flown earlier that day with a different crew.

At approximately 6:22 p.m. Alaska Daylight Time (UTC-8), the C-17 took off from Runway 06 at Elmendorf AFB to practice the display routine. After the initial climb, followed by a left turn, the pilot executed a sharp right turn.

As the aircraft banked, the stall warning system activated to alert the crew of an impending stall. Instead of implementing stall recovery procedures, the pilot continued the turn and the aircraft entered a stall from which recovery was not possible.

Aircraft

The aircraft was a four-engined C-17 Globemaster III built by Boeing. It belonged to the 3rd Wing (3 WG) and operated jointly with the 176th Wing (176 WG) at Elmendorf AFB, located near downtown Anchorage. The aircraft had USAF serial number "00-0173" and was named Spirit of the Aleutians.

The U.S. Air Force has 222 C-17s in service with the active Air Force, Air Force Reserve, and Air National Guard (ANG), with the type being based at Elmendorf since June 2007. At the time of the crash, the base had eight of the aircraft, operated jointly by an active duty Air Force organization, the 3rd Wing's 517th Airlift Squadron; and an Alaska Air National Guard unit, the 176th Wing's 249th Airlift Squadron. The mishap was the first fatal crash of a C-17.

Crew

The four crew members on board all died; they were majors Michael Freyholtz and Aaron Malone, pilots assigned to the Alaska ANG's 249th Airlift Squadron; Captain Jeffrey Hill, a pilot assigned to Elmendorf's active-duty Air Force's 517th Airlift Squadron; and Senior Master Sergeant Thomas E. Cicardo, a loadmaster of the Alaska ANG's 249th Airlift Squadron.

Aftermath
A member of the Anchorage Fire Department described how a fireball extended to around  into the air, an estimated  from Anchorage. Debris from the crash was spread along  of the Alaska Railroad tracks which carry passenger and freight trains daily through the base area, north to Wasilla, although no trains were scheduled to be passing through at the time of the crash.

Track repairs to the nearby railroad caused freight services to be suspended, and passenger services to be diverted by bus. The air show went ahead as planned as a tribute to the four dead airmen.

Investigation

The investigation report into the crash was released on 13 December 2010. It blamed pilot error, stating that the pilot's overconfidence in executing an aggressive right-turn maneuver led to a low-altitude stall and subsequent crash, despite the warnings correctly provided by the aircraft's stall-warning system, to which neither the pilot nor any other crew member responded effectively.

The accident displayed significant similarities with the 1994 crash of a B-52 bomber at Fairchild Air Force Base, Washington. On both occasions, the local USAF unit's chain of command apparently failed to prevent the pilots involved from developing deliberately unsafe flying practices for aerial displays of large aircraft.

See also
 1994 Fairchild Air Force Base B-52 crash
 1995 Alaska Boeing E-3 Sentry accident
 List of airshow accidents and incidents

References

External links

 

2010 in Alaska
Accidents and incidents involving United States Air Force aircraft
Articles containing video clips
Aviation accidents and incidents in Alaska
Aviation accidents and incidents in the United States in 2010
July 2010 events in the United States